Roost-Warendin is a commune in the Nord department in northern France.

Population

Twin towns
Roost-Warendin is twinned with:

  Haltern am See, Germany

Heraldry

See also
Communes of the Nord department

References

Roostwarendin